台東 may refer to:
 Taito (disambiguation)
 Taitung (disambiguation)